Sybra nigrofasciata is a species of beetle in the family Cerambycidae. It was described by Per Olof Christopher Aurivillius in 1927.

References

nigrofasciata
Beetles described in 1927